Bennu Yıldırımlar Yarar (born 22 November 1969) is a Turkish actress known for her performance in Yaprak Dökümü as Firket Tekin, Umutsuz Ev Kadınları as Nermin, Kadın as Hatice, and Süper Baba as Elif.

Biography 
Her family is Turkish origin who immigrated from Macedonia and Cretan, Greece. Bennu Yıldırımlar studied at Erenköy Girls High School and graduated from Istanbul University State Conservatory in 1990. From 1990 to 1991, she gained experience at the Westminster Adult Education Institute in London. Yıldırımlar was chosen 'Most Promising new Actress' at the 6th Ankara Film Festival for her role in Ağrıya Dönüş in 1994. In 1999, she was given the 'Best Actress' Sadri Alışık award for her performance in the film Kaç Para Kaç.

She has been married to actor Bülent Emin Yarar since 1995.

Filmography

References

External links 
 

1969 births
Living people
Actresses from Istanbul
Turkish film actresses
Turkish stage actresses
Turkish television actresses
Erenköy Girls High School alumni
Golden Butterfly Award winners